Nepal Television is the state owned television corporation of Nepal. The list of programs run by it are as follows-

Currently broadcast by Nepal Television

 Jhayai kuti jhayai
 Madan Bahadur Hari Bahadur 4
 Meri Bassai
 Sisnu Pani
 Tato Na Saro
 Tito Piro
 Virus
 Halka Ramailo

Kids 
 Barbapapa
 Eureeka's Castle
 Khushiko Sansar (Happy World)
 Moomin
 Mr. Fantus
 Nature Calls
 Opening Children Programme
 Poppets Town
 Yvon of the Yukon
 Tom and Jerry

Drama 
 Aphanta
 Guthi
 Santan
  Bharosha 
 Sunaulo Sansar
 Yatra Jindagi Ko
 Singha Durbar
 Bhagya afno
 Gahana
 Karuna 2
 Parichay
 Parichay 2
 Jeevan Chakra
 Dear Jindagi

Game show
 Cham Chami
 Magical Thumb-A Live Game Show
 Pratibhako Aagan
 Singing Icon Nepal
 The Singing Star

Miscellaneous
 Artha ko Artha
 Krishi Karyakram
 Mero Ghar Mero Sansar
 Swasthya Charcha

News 
 समाचार (Samachar Ntv) (8:00 pm)

Reality 
 Maile Je Bhoge
 Sero Phero

Talk show

Formerly broadcast by Nepal Television
 Aayam
 Abhibyakti
 Biswo Ghatna
 Chintan Manan/Manthan
 Hamro Gaun Ramro Gaun
 Hijo Aaj Ka Kura
 Hostel
 Khel Khel
 Mayos Super Challenge
 Nagad Panch Lakh
 Nepali Tara
 Sanibar Vijay Kumar Sanga
  Pathvarsta 
  Adrisya ghau
 Bishwas
  Mahabharat 
  Ghar Pariwar 
 Ghas khatne khurera ayo joban hukrera 
  Bhaigoni tw 
 Aama 2
  Good Morning Sir 
  Lal Purja 
  Bhoot
  Kaslai afno Bhanu 
  BeliChameli 
  S.L.C 
  Jalpari 
  Mamata 
 Sankha   Dashain ko Chahangra   jhau kiri " Ujalo tira ko 
  Bhagwat geeta (Nepali Dubbed)
 Cham Chami
  utsarga 
 Good Morning Sir 
 Hari Bdr Madan Bdr ३
 Aama 
Lal Purja
  Thatta 
  Twaka Tukka 
 Vikram Aur Bettal (Nepali dubbed)
  ghaito maa ghaam 
  jeevan Asha
  Devi 2 

  15 gate
  Bish 
 Ujalo  Tira ko 
 Sunsnu pani jahaama
  Mann 
 Jhajhalko 
  DactoR Saab 
  Bhumika 
  Mashan 
  Sangam 
  Pratidondi 
  kantipur 
 Thorai bhaye pugi sari 
  Sindoor 
  afanta 
  Adsiaaya ghau 
 Ramayan (Nepali Version) 
  Chandrakanta (Nepali Version)
 Shree krishna ( Nepali version)
 Motu Patlu 
 Apradh 
  Dalan 
  Bhishma pratigiya 
  Son Pari (Nepali Version)
 Kakigandaki ko sero phero 
 Abiral Bagdacha Inrawati 

Programmes
Nepal Television